is a song recorded by Japanese singer Misia. It was released on 25 November 2015 by Ariola Japan as the fifth and final single from her twelfth studio album, Love Bebop (2016). Misia wrote the lyrics and Shirō Sagisu composed, arranged and produced the track. "Orphans no Namida" serves as the first ending theme to the 2015 anime series Mobile Suit Gundam: Iron-Blooded Orphans. In commemoration of the 70th postwar broadcast, Misia performed the album version of "Orphans no Namida" at the 66th NHK Kōhaku Uta Gassen, live from the Nagasaki Peace Park.

Background and release
The backing track to "Orphans no Namida" was recorded in June 2014 at Eastcote Studios, London and Sony Music Studios Tokyo, Tokyo. Additionally, the strings were recorded at Abbey Road Studios. The vocals were recorded over a year later on 23 August 2015 at Rhythmedia Studio in Tokyo. Misia first performed the song on the first date of her Misia Candle Night 2015 concert tour, in Fujikawaguchiko on 21 September 2015. On 11 October 2015, the song premiered at the end of the second episode of Mobile Suit Gundam: Iron-Blooded Orphans. The full version premiered on 20 October 2017 on Misia's NHK FM Broadcast radio show Misia: Hoshizora no Radio. "Orphans no Namida" was released for download and as Misia's thirty-second CD single simultaneously on 25 November 2015. The CD single was issued in standard and limited editions, the latter including an exclusive remix of Misia's "Edge of This World". The song "Hana", written by singer-songwriter Rica, was included on the single as a B-side. The standard edition was also released in high-resolution audio throughout digital platforms.

Composition
"Orphans no Namida" was written by Misia and Shirō Sagisu and produced by the latter. The song is a pop ballad with soul and jazz influences, and lyrics descriptive of the series' plot. "Orphans no Namida" is written in the key of B-flat minor and follows a tempo of 76 beats per minute. Misia's vocals span from G3 to D5 in the single version and from G3 to F5 in the album version. The album version runs 36 seconds longer than the single version and includes newly recorded ad-libs at the end of the song.

Chart performance
"Orphans no Namida" peaked at number 18 on the Billboard Japan Hot 100 chart. The single debuted at number 23 on both the weekly Oricon Singles Chart, with 6,000 copies sold, and Billboard Top Singles Sales chart. The single charted on the Oricon Singles Chart for ten weeks and sold a reported total of 14,000 copies. On digital outlets, the single entered at the top of the weekly Mora Albums Chart with the high-resolution release and at number 4 with the standard lossy release. The title track itself debuted at number 5 on the weekly Mora Singles Chart and at number 10 on the weekly RecoChoku Singles Chart.

Track listing

Credits and personnel
Recording
Recorded at: Abbey Road Studios and Eastcote Studios, London, United Kingdom, Beethoven Studio, Paris, France, Sony Music Studios Tokyo, Tokyo, Japan and Rhythmedia Studio, Tokyo, Japan; mixed at Rhythmedia Studio in Tokyo, Japan.

Personnel
Vocals – Misia
Background vocals – Misia, Lorrain Briscoe, Evette Briscoe, Paul Lee
Songwriting – Misia, Shirō Sagisu
Production, arrangement, programming – Shirō Sagisu
Mixing – Masahiro Kawaguchi
Mastering – Herb Powers Jr.
Recording – Shirō Sagisu, Jonathan Allen, Philip Bagenal, George Murphy, Masahiro Kawaguchi
Drums – Gary Husband
Rhodes – Mark Walker, Yasuharu Nakanishi
Acoustic piano – Yasuharu Nakanishi
Electric guitar – Andrew Smith
Acoustic guitar – Takayuki Hijikata
Percussions – Karlos Edwards
Trumpet – Steve Sidwell
Tenor Sax – Jamie Talbot
Baritone Sax – Dave Bishop
Strings – The London Studio Orchestra
Conductor – Nick Ingman
Hammond organ – Mark Walker
Violin – Perry Montague-Mason, Emlyn Singleton
Viola – Peter Lale
Cello – Martin Loveday
Contrabass – Chris Laurence
Harp – Skaila Kanga

Charts

Release history

References

2015 singles
2015 songs
2010s ballads
Misia songs
Songs written by Misia
Songs written by Shirō Sagisu
Song recordings produced by Shirō Sagisu
Pop ballads
Soul ballads
Anime songs
Anti-war songs
Ariola Japan singles